Sylvania Heights is a locality in southern Sydney, in the state of New South Wales, Australia. Sylvania Heights is located in the north-western part of the suburb of Sylvania.

The main road through the locality is Princes Highway which is lined with shops, including Sylvania Heights Plaza.

Sydney localities
Sutherland Shire